William Potter (8 February 1872 – 26 September 1970) was an Australian rules footballer who played for the Fitzroy Football Club in the Victorian Football League (VFL).

Family
The son of David Potter, and Joanna Potter, née Fyffe, William Potter was born at Lucknow, Victoria on 8 February 1872.

Football
Potter, a follower, made his debut in 1898. He played in each of the first three VFL Grand Finals: in the 1898 premiership team, the 1899 premiership team, and the losing 1900 Grand Final team.

References
 Holmesby, Russell & Main, Jim (2007). The Encyclopedia of AFL Footballers. 7th ed. Melbourne: Bas Publishing.

External links

 

1872 births
1970 deaths
Australian Rules footballers: place kick exponents
Fitzroy Football Club players
Fitzroy Football Club Premiership players
Australian rules footballers from Victoria (Australia)
Two-time VFL/AFL Premiership players
People from Bairnsdale